Tielemans is a Dutch patronymic surname. Tieleman is a primarily archaic Dutch given name that could be of West Frisian origin or a nickname of Theodorus. It had many spellings (e.g. Thielman, Tielman, Tilman, Tylman) and variations on the patronym include Thieleman, Thielemans, Thielman, Tieleman, Tielman, Tilleman and Tillemans . People with these surnames include:

As a surname
Thielemans
Freddy Thielemans (born 1944), Belgian politician
 (1825–1898), Belgian composer, conductor and organist
Toots Thielemans (1922-2016), Belgian jazz musician known for his harmonica playing and whistling
Thielman
Henry Thielman (1880–1942), American baseball pitcher
Jake Thielman (1879–1928), American baseball pitcher, brother of Henry
Vale P. Thielman (1843–1925), American politician
Tieleman
Bill Tieleman, Canadian political columnist
Laurence Tieleman (born 1972), Belgian-Italian tennis player
Tielemans
Jean-François Tielemans (1799–1887), Belgian lawyer and politician
Olivier Tielemans (born 1984), Dutch race car driver
Youri Tielemans (born 1997), Belgian footballer

As a given name
Thieleman
Thieleman J. van Braght (1625–1664), Dutch Anabaptist author
Tieleman
Tieleman Roosterman (1598–1673), Dutch cloth merchant painted by Frans Hals
Tieleman Franciscus Suys (1783–1864), Flemish architect
Tieleman Vuurman (1899–1991), Dutch sports shooter.

References

Dutch-language surnames
Patronymic surnames